The 1986 Grand Prix d'Automne was the 80th edition of the Paris–Tours cycle race and was held on 12 October 1986. The race started in Créteil and finished in Chaville. The race was won by Phil Anderson.

General classification

References

1986 in French sport
1986
1986 Super Prestige Pernod International